Abdel Majid Moncef (born 10 May 1961) is a Moroccan Olympic middle-distance runner. He represented his country in the men's 1500 meters at the 1992 Summer Olympics. His time was a 3:41.73 in the first heat, and a DNF in the semifinals.

References

1961 births
Living people
Moroccan male middle-distance runners
Olympic athletes of Morocco
Athletes (track and field) at the 1988 Summer Olympics